Joe Lutkenhaus is a professor at the University of Kansas Medical Center. He received a B.S. in organic chemistry from Iowa state University and then a PhD in biochemistry for the University of California, Los Angeles. Following his PhD, Lutkenhaus pursued his postdoctoral studies with William Donachie at the University of Edinburgh and then continued at the University of Connecticut Health Science center. In 2002, Lutkenhaus became a fellow of the American Academy of Microbiology.

Lutkenhaus discovered, among other things, that the FtsZ protein forms a ring around the division plane in bacteria and is thus a key factor in bacterial cell division.

Honors
Member of the American Academy of Microbiology
2012 Louisa Gross Horwitz Prize
2014 Member of the National Academy of Sciences

References

1947 births
American microbiologists
Living people
University of Kansas faculty
Iowa State University alumni
David Geffen School of Medicine at UCLA alumni
Members of the United States National Academy of Sciences
Academics_of_the_University_of_Edinburgh